Sonal Shah may refer to:

Sonal Shah (actress) American actress on TV's Scrubs
Sonal Shah (economist) (born 1968), American economist